The Temple House is a historic house at 1702 South Oak Street in Pine Bluff, Arkansas.  It is a two-story brown brick structure, with a low-pitch hip roof and broad eaves typical of the Prairie School of architecture.  A single-story flat-roof porch extends across the front, continuing to a form a porte-cochere to the left, with brick piers and low brick wall with stone coping.  The house was built c. 1910 to a design by the architectural firm of Theo Sanders.

The house was listed on the National Register of Historic Places in 1982.

See also
National Register of Historic Places listings in Jefferson County, Arkansas

References

Houses completed in 1910
Houses in Pine Bluff, Arkansas
Houses on the National Register of Historic Places in Arkansas
National Register of Historic Places in Pine Bluff, Arkansas
Prairie School architecture